Nathalie Joanne Emmanuel (born 2 March 1989) is a British actress. Emmanuel began her acting career appearing in theatre in the late 1990s, acquiring roles in various West End productions such as the musical The Lion King. In 2006, she began her on-screen career by starring as Sasha Valentine in soap opera Hollyoaks, after which she appeared in various British television series until her debut film appearance in Twenty8k.

Emmanuel gained international recognition for her role as Missandei in the HBO fantasy series Game of Thrones (2013–2019), and continued her career with supporting roles in Maze Runner: The Scorch Trials (2015) and its sequel Maze Runner: The Death Cure (2018), the Fast & Furious films Furious 7 (2015), The Fate of the Furious (2017), and F9 (2021), and had a role in Army of Thieves (2021).

Early life
Emmanuel was born on 2 March 1989 in Southend-on-Sea, a city Essex, England. Her mother is Dominican, and her father is of half-Saint Lucian and half English descent. She has an older sister. Emmanuel recalled that her mother first took notice of her passion and desire to become an actress during Emmanuel's attendance at the private St Hilda's School, which closed in 2014, and later the Westcliff High School for Girls grammar school. In an interview with the New York Daily News, she commented, "When I was 3, [I'd] always cause drama that my mum decided maybe I should channel it properly—so she started me on acting, singing and dancing classes". At the age of 10, she played Young Nala in the West End production of the musical The Lion King.

Career

In 2006, she made her television debut, starring as Sasha Valentine in the soap opera Hollyoaks. Emmanuel appeared on the show until 2010, her character's storylines included prostitution, and heroin addiction.

In January 2012, Emmanuel presented BBC Three's Websex: What's the Harm?, investigating the online sexual habits of 16–24 year olds in the UK. Later in the same year she made her film debut in the thriller Twenty8k.

The following year, she was cast as Missandei, Daenerys Targaryen's interpreter, in HBO's fantasy drama series Game of Thrones. In an interview with Jimmy Kimmel, she confirmed that she received the news about winning the role when she was working in a clothes store as a shop assistant. In 2015, Emmanuel was promoted to a regular cast member on the show. Missandei was the only prominent character that was a woman of colour in the show, and her death scene, which took place whilst she was in chains, was unpopular among fans, being called an example of fridging and evoking an image of slavery. Emmanuel later told The Guardian:

Also in 2015, she played computer hacker Ramsey in the action film Furious 7, and Harriet in the science fiction adventure Maze Runner: The Scorch Trials. For the former Emmanuel won the Screen Nation award for Best Female Performance in Film. She played Harriet once again in the movie Maze Runner: The Death Cure in 2018.

In 2017, Emmanuel said that she learnt "the art of subtlety" playing Missandei, and that as she was working on soundstages and with greenscreens when playing Ramsey, that role developed the use of her imagination when acting.  She reprised her role of Ramsey in The Fate of the Furious in 2017; she played Ramsey again in F9, which was due to be released in May 2020, but was postponed until June 2021 due to the COVID-19 pandemic.

Emmanuel played Maya, a political speechwriter, in the romantic comedy television series Four Weddings and a Funeral for Hulu, and was the voice of Deet in The Dark Crystal: Age of Resistance Netflix series, both released in 2019.

In July 2020 Emmanuel costarred opposite Kevin Hart and John Travolta in the Quibi original action-comedy series Die Hart.

In May 2022, Emmanuel joined the cast of Francis Ford Coppola's upcoming film, Megalopolis.

In 2022, she starred alongside Thomas Doherty in the supernatural horror film The Invitation.

In the media
FHM magazine ranked Emmanuel as 99th in their 100 Sexiest Women of 2013, and 75th in their Sexiest Women of 2015. In 2015, she also appeared in the April issue of InStyle and GQ magazines.

Personal life
Emmanuel follows a plant-based diet for health reasons, and told Glamour magazine in 2017 that "I don't trust the food industry, I don't trust what they put in our belly – it makes me feel sick actually."

Filmography

Film

Television

Radio

Recognition and awards

References

External links

 
 

21st-century English actresses
1989 births
Actresses from Essex
English musical theatre actresses
English people of Dominica descent
English people of Saint Lucian descent
English soap opera actresses
English television actresses
Living people
People educated at Westcliff High School for Girls
People from Southend-on-Sea